Paul Gow (born 10 November 1970) is an Australian professional golfer.

Gow was born in Sydney, Australia. He turned professional in 1993.

Gow has won three times on the Nationwide Tour, once in 1997, once in 2000, and once in 2006. He has never won on the PGA Tour, but he did come close when he lost in a playoff to Jeff Sluman at the 2001 B.C. Open.

Gow is 0-for-3 in playoffs on the Nationwide Tour, all of which were lost during the 2004 season, in which he finished 11th on the final money list.

Professional wins (4)

PGA Tour of Australasia wins (1)

Nationwide Tour wins (3)

Nationwide Tour playoff record (0–3)

Playoff record
PGA Tour playoff record (0–1)

Results in major championships

CUT = missed the half-way cut
Note: Gow only played in the U.S. Open.

Team appearances
Amateur
Australian Men's Interstate Teams Matches (representing New South Wales): 1989 (winners), 1990 (winners), 1991 (winners), 1992 (winners), 1993

Professional
World Cup (representing Australia): 1999

See also
2000 Buy.com Tour graduates
2004 Nationwide Tour graduates
2006 PGA Tour Qualifying School graduates

External links

Australian male golfers
PGA Tour golfers
PGA Tour of Australasia golfers
Korn Ferry Tour graduates
Golfers from Sydney
1970 births
Living people